Ogmodera sulcata is a species of beetle in the family Cerambycidae. It was described by Per Olof Christopher Aurivillius in 1908.

References

Apomecynini
Beetles described in 1908